Boyd Elementary School may refer to:
 Hugh J. Boyd, Jr. Elementary School - Seaside Heights, New Jersey - Seaside Heights School District
 Mariam Boyd Elementary School - Warrenton, North Carolina - Warren County Schools
 William M. Boyd Elementary School - Atlanta, Georgia - Atlanta Public Schools